Joseph Patrick Michael Leydon (born August 22, 1952) is an American film critic and historian. A critic and correspondent for Variety since 1990, he is the author of Joe Leydon's Guide to Essential Movies You Must See (Michael Wiese Productions), and was a contributing critic for Leonard Maltin's Movie Guide. As of July 2021 he has 1225 reviews collected on the website Rotten Tomatoes. He is also a founding member of Houston Film Critics Society, and a voting member of Critics Choice. From 2001 until 2021, Leydon taught film and communication studies courses at Houston Community College and the Jack J. Valenti School of Communication at University of Houston.

Life and career
Leydon was born in New Orleans, Louisiana and raised in the city's Ninth Ward. He graduated from Loyola University with a degree in journalism (with a minor in film). At Loyola, he studied under the late Ralph T. Bell. In 2007, he earned a Master of Arts degree at the Jack J. Valenti School of Communication at University of Houston.

Leydon was a film critic for The Houston Post from 1982 until the paper’s demise in 1995. He has also reviewed films for The Houston Press, The San Francisco Examiner, MSNBC.com, and NBC affiliate KPRC-TV in Houston. His work as a journalist, interviewer, and feature writer has appeared in the New York Daily News, Los Angeles Times, Newsday, The Tennessean, The Boston Globe, Toronto Star, and the Austin American-Statesman; Film Comment, MovieMaker, Houstonia, and New Orleans magazines. From 2001 to 2020, he taught film studies courses at Houston Community College. Leydon is a senior writer for Cowboys & Indians Magazine. 

In a December 17, 2011 post on his blog, Leydon revealed that he had been diagnosed with prostate cancer in 2009, and that he had survived treatment and was in remission.

References

External links

 Moving Picture Show (Leydon official site)
 Moving Picture Blog (Leydon's blog)

1952 births
American film critics
Living people
Writers from New Orleans
University of Houston faculty
University of Houston alumni
American film historians
American male non-fiction writers
Variety (magazine) people
Historians from Louisiana